Tetsushi (written: 哲司, 哲史, 哲志, 徹志 or 哲士) is a masculine Japanese given name. Notable people with the name include:

, Japanese footballer
, Japanese sumo wrestler
, Japanese politician
, Japanese writer
, Japanese actor

Japanese masculine given names